Underworld (also called Transmutations) is a 1985 British horror film directed by George Pavlou, written by Clive Barker and James Caplin, and starring Denholm Elliott, Nicola Cowper, Steven Berkoff, Larry Lamb, Ingrid Pitt, Irina Brook and Art Malik.

The film's music was produced by Welsh new wave band Freur, which later evolved into the band Underworld, their name taken from the film's title.

Plot
Dr. Savary (Elliott), a sinister biochemist, has created a subhuman species that dwells in the London Underground. Addicted to Savary's mind-expanding drug, his creations suffer from grotesque disfigurements. The victims' only hope for an antidote lies in kidnapping Nicole (Cowper), a high-class prostitute. Roy Bain (Lamb), a fearless adventurer and Nicole's former lover, is hired to save her.

Cast
 Denholm Elliott - Dr. Savary
Steven Berkoff - Hugo Motherskille
Larry Lamb - Roy Bain
Miranda Richardson - Oriel
Art Malik - Fluke
Nicola Cowper - Nicole
Irina Brook - Bianca
Ingrid Pitt - Pepperdine
Brian Croucher - Darling

Release
After a quick cinema run in the UK, the film was given a limited release in the United States by Empire Pictures in April 1986. Two years later, the film was released on video cassette by Vestron Video.

References

External links

 

1985 films
British science fiction films
Films about drugs
Empire International Pictures films
British independent films
Mad scientist films
1985 horror films
British horror films
1980s science fiction horror films
Films set in London
Films about prostitution in the United Kingdom
1980s English-language films
1980s British films